Lucas Ferrari (born 31 March 1997) is an Argentine professional footballer who plays as a left-back for All Boys.

Career
Ferrari got his career underway in the ranks of Ferro Carril Oeste. His first appearance for the club arrived on 3 March 2019 during a win over Mitre at the Estadio Arquitecto Ricardo Etcheverry, participating for sixty-three minutes before being substituted off for Sebastián Olivarez.

After a loan spell at Ciudad de Bolívar in 2021, Ferrari joined All Boys in January 2022.

Career statistics
.

References

External links

1997 births
Living people
Place of birth missing (living people)
Argentine footballers
Association football defenders
Primera Nacional players
Ferro Carril Oeste footballers
All Boys footballers